What is Living and What is Dead in Indian Philosophy is a 1976 book by Debiprasad Chattopadhyaya.

Explaining the relationship between the soul and consciousness in the Nyaya-Vaisesika philosophy, Debiprasad Chattopadhyaya makes three points. First, consciousness in this view is knowledge (jnana) in an empirical sense. Second, consciousness is one of the multiple qualities of the soul. Third, consciousness is a transient quality, not a permanent quality. By itself, the soul is without consciousness; consciousness is produced in the soul only when it is conjoined with certain other entities. Hiriyanna, commenting on this point, notes: 

Hiriyanna expresses his perplexity in reviewing the Nyaya-Vaisesika view of consciousness, and then comes out with a comment equating this view with the Charvaka view of consciousness:

References

External links
 

Philosophy books
1976 non-fiction books